Dip or DIP, may refer to:

"Dip" term
Dip may refer to:

People
 Dip, a name in Gujarati meaning Diya
 Dip Gogoi (born 1951), Indian politician
 Dip Orange (1900–1946), American baseball infielder

Diving and lowering
 A brief swim, as in skinny dipping
 Voltage dip, the British term for voltage sag
 Flag dipping, to dip a flag that is being carried as a sign of respect or deference
 Plunge dip, a method of immersing livestock in pesticide
 Dip (dance move), a partner dance move
 Dip (exercise), a type of strength training exercise
 Dip bar, a piece of fitness equipment
 Dip (food), a type of sauce into which food is dipped

Geometry and science
 Dip (geometry), a decagonal prism
 Dip (geology) (strike and dip), the orientation or attitude of a geologic feature
 Dip slope, a geological term for a slope parallel to the dip
 Dip circle, used to measure the angle between magnetic dip and the horizon
 Magnetic dip, the angle made with the horizontal at any point by the Earth's magnetic field
 Horizon dip, the angle below horizontal for an elevated observer at sea

Entertainment
 The Dip, the tenth published book by Seth Godin
 Dip (album), a 2007 studio album by Scottish musician Aidan Moffat
 "Dip", a single by Danny Brown from his 2013 album Old
 Dip (Tyga song), a 2018 song by Tyga
 Dip (TV series), an online 201 Turkish TV series

Other uses
 Dipping sauce, a common condiment for many types of food
 Dipping tobacco, a colloquial name for American moist snuff
 Dip (Catalan myth), an evil demonic dog that drinks people's blood
 Dip reader, device for reading an electronically encoded card
 Dip pen, a pen, also called a nib pen
 An abbreviation of the word "diploma"

"DIP" acronyms and codes
DIP may refer to:

Science and technology

Biology and medicine
 Database of Interacting Proteins, a catalog of protein interactions
 Defective interfering particle, a virus particle that is missing part or all of its genome
 Desquamative interstitial pneumonia, a form of idiopathic interstitial pneumonia
 Distal interphalangeal joint (disambiguation), in anatomy

Computer science and electrical engineering
 Dependency inversion principle or Inversion of control, in software architecture design
 Device-independent pixel (also: density-independent pixel), unit of measurement
 Digital image processing, use of computer algorithms to perform image processing
 Diindenoperylene, an organic semiconductor
 Director's IP address, a term used by the Linux Virtual Server
 Distributed information processing, a field of computer science
 DIP Research (for Distributed Information Processing), a defunct company which designed the Atari Portfolio
 Document image processing
 Dual in-line package, a type of integrated circuit packaging
 DIP switch, a number of electric switches in a dual in-line package
 DIP DRAM, i.e., DRAM using a dual in-line package, a memory module format for computers

Other uses in science and technology
 Deinked pulp, in paper production
 Diiminopyridine, a class of ligand, in chemistry

Places
 Dezhou East railway station, China Railway telegraph code DIP
 Diapaga Airport in Burkina Faso, airport code DIP
 Dubai Investments Park, United Arab Emirates

Other uses
 Ductile iron pipe, a pipe made of ductile cast iron commonly used for potable water transmission and distribution
 Debtor in possession, a type of financing
 Direct Income Payments, agricultural support payments in the European Union
 Drug Interventions Programme, run by the United Kingdom's government
 Drunk in public, or public intoxication, a summary offense in many countries
 Dvukhmyestnyi Istrebitel Pushechny, a two-seat cannon fighter, the military designation of the Tupolev ANT-29
 Revolutionary Workers' Party (Turkey) of Turkey

See also
DIPS (disambiguation)
Dipping (disambiguation)
 Dip angle (disambiguation)